Panmure RFC is a rugby union club based in Broughty Ferry in Dundee, Scotland.

History

Panmure was founded in 1880 and joined the Scottish Rugby Union in 1884.

The name Panmure was chosen as many of the club's original members stayed in Panmure Terrace, Dundee.

The club began in Dundee but moved to Broughty Ferry in 1888, as tenants of Forfarshire Cricket Club.

Panmure Sevens

The club began the Panmure Sevens tournament in 1986. Teams play for the President's Trophy.

Honours

Midlands Rugby Championship (1910–11),(1922–23)
North of Scotland Cup (1912–13, 1936–37, 1937-38*, 1938-39*)
National Division 5 Caledonia (2005–06).
RBS Caledonia 3 Midlands (2011–12)
BT Caledonia Regional Bowl Midlands (2017–18)

Notable former players

Scotland internationals

North of Scotland District

These players played for the combined North of Scotland side (which contained Midlands players).

North and Midlands District

These players played for the North and Midlands side.

Midlands District

These players played for the Midlands District side.

References

Scottish rugby union teams
Rugby clubs established in 1880
Broughty Ferry
Rugby union in Dundee
1880 establishments in Scotland